The following is an episode list for the Nickelodeon sketch comedy series The Amanda Show. The series premiered on October 16, 1999 and ended on September 21, 2002. Six additional "Best of..." episodes aired after 40 episodes were produced in total. Amanda Bynes and Drake Bell were the only actors to appear in every episode.

Series overview

Episode list

Season 1 (1999–2000) 
The first season aired from October 16, 1999 to February 19, 2000. The main cast features Amanda Bynes, Drake Bell, Nancy Sullivan, Raquel Lee, and Johnny Kassir. Recurring cast includes Andrew Hill Newman and E. E. Bell as Barney, the security guard. Every episode in this season is written by Dan Schneider, Andrew Hill Newman, John Hoberg, Christy Stratton & Jenny Kilgen. It was the only season to feature Raquel Lee and Johnny Kassir as regular cast members. This season was filmed from February to October 1999. The intro, only for season one, was produced by Nickelodeon Animation Studio.
 In this season, Amanda Bynes goes from 12 to 13 while filming.

Season 2 (2000–01) 
The second season aired from July 15, 2000 to April 7, 2001. The main cast features Amanda Bynes, Drake Bell, Nancy Sullivan and newcomer Josh Peck. Recurring cast includes Andrew Hill Newman, E. E. Bell, Maureen McCormick,  Danny Bonaduce, Lara Jill Miller, Lauren Petty, Matthew Botuchis, Molly Orr and Taran Killam of "Moody's Point". Every episode in this season is written by Dan Schneider, Andrew Hill Newman, John Hoberg and Steven Molaro.

 Taped from May 2000 to January  2001.
 In this season, Amanda Bynes is 14 while filming.

Season 3 (2002) 
The third season aired from January 19, 2002 to September 21, 2002. The cast and writers remain the same as previous season. It was taped from May 2000 to January 2001.
 In this season, Amanda Bynes is still 14 while filming.

The Best of The Amanda Show (2002)
After the series ended its initial run, six "The Best of..." episodes were produced.

References 

General references 
 
 
 

Amanda Show
Amanda Show
Lists of American comedy television series episodes